{{Automatic taxobox
|taxon = Alvania
|image = Alvania clathrella 001.jpg
|image_caption = Alvania clathrella
|authority = Risso, 1826
|synonyms_ref = 
|synonyms = 
 Acinopsis Monterosato, 1884
 Acinulus Monterosato [in Seguenza], 1903
 Acinus Monterosato, 1884
 Actonia Monterosato, 1884
 Alcidia Monterosato, 1890 † (invalid: junior homonym of Alcidia Westwood, 1879 [Lepidoptera]; Alcidiella is a replacement name)
 Alcidiella Cossmann, 1921 †
 Alvanea (incorrect subsequent spelling)
 Alvania (Acinulus) Seguenza, 1903 (Not sufficiently different from Alvania s.s.)
 Alvania (Alvanolira) F. Nordsieck, 1972
 Alvania (Alvinia) Monterosato, 1884
 Alvania (Coronalvania)  F. Nordsieck, 1972
 Alvania (Lanciella) F. Nordsieck, 1972
 Alvania (Linemera) Finlay, 1924
 Alvania (Moniziella) F. Nordsieck, 1972
 Alvania (Willetia) (incorrect subsequent spelling)
  Alvania (Willettia) Gordon, 1939 (Willettia synonymized with Alvania)
 Alvaniella Monterosato [in Sacco], 1895
 Alvanolira F. Nordsieck, 1972
 Alvinia Monterosato, 1884
 Alvinia (Conalvinia) Ponder, 1967
 Alvinia (Linemera) Finlay, 1924
 Ameririssoa Ponder, 1985
 Arsenia Monterosato, 1891
 Conalvinia Ponder, 1967
 Flemellia Nordsieck, 1972
 Galeodina Monterosato, 1884
 Linemera Finlay, 1924
 Manzonia (Alvinia) Monterosato, 1884
 Manzonia (Andrewiella)  F. Nordsieck, 1972
 Massotia Bucquoy, Dautzenberg & Dollfus, 1884
 Moniziella Nordsieck, 1972
 Profundialvania Taviani, 1975
 Pseudalvania R. Janssen, 1967
 Pusillina (Ameririssoa) Ponder, 1985
 Rissoa (Alvania) (Alvinia) Monterosato, 1884
 Rissoa (Galeodina) Monterosato, 1884
 Rissoia (Alvania) Risso, 1826
 Thapsia Monterosato, 1884 (invalid: junior homonym of Thapsia Albers, 1860; Thapsiella is a replacement name)Thapsiella P. Fischer, 1885
 'Turbona Leach [in Gray], 1847
 Turbona (Massotiella) F. Nordsieck, 1972
Zacanthusa Leach, 1852
| type_species = Alvania cimex
| type_species_authority = (Linnaeus, 1758)
| subdivision_ranks = Species
| subdivision = See text
| display_parents = 3
}}Alvania is a genus of minute sea snails, marine gastropod mollusks or micromollusks in the family Rissoidae.Alvania as currently used may not be monophyletic. 

Distribution
These marine species can be found worldwide (except in the Antarctic and Subantarctic regions).

Species
Species within the genus Alvania include:Alvania aartseni Verduin, 1986Alvania abrupta (Dell, 1956)Alvania abstersa van der Linden & van Aartsen, 1993
 † Alvania acuticarinata Landau, Ceulemans & Van Dingenen, 2018Alvania adiaphoros Bouchet & Warén, 1993Alvania adinogramma Bouchet & Warén, 1993Alvania aeoliae Palazzi, 1988Alvania aequisculpta Keep, 1887Alvania africana Gofas, 1999
 † Alvania aglaja De Stefani & Pantanelli in De Stefani, 1888
 Alvania akibai (Yokoyama, 1926)
 Alvania albachiarae Perugia, 2021Alvania alboranensis Peñas & Rolán, 2006
 † Alvania alfredbelli Faber, 2017 †Alvania algeriana (Monterosato, 1877)
 Alvania aliceae Amati, 2014
 † Alvania allixi Cossmann, 1919Alvania almo Bartsch, 1911
 † Alvania alta Bałuk, 1975Alvania amatii Oliverio, 1986
 † Alvania amoena Tabanelli, Bongiardino & Perugia, 2011
 † Alvania amphitrite Thivaiou, Harzhauser & Koskeridou, 2019
 † Alvania ampulla (Eichwald, 1853)
 † Alvania anabaptizata Boettger, 1906
 † Alvania andraldensis Lozouet, 1998Alvania angioyi van Aartsen, 1982Alvania angularis (Warén, 1996)
 † Alvania angusticostata Traub, 1981
 Alvania annetteae Amati, Danzelle & Devauchelle, 2018Alvania annobonensis Rolán, 2004
 † Alvania antwerpiensis Glibert, 1952
 † Alvania aquensis (Grateloup, 1838)
 † Alvania areolifera (Sandberger, 1863)Alvania argentea (Sowerby III, 1892)
 † Alvania argillensis Lozouet, 1998
 †Alvania armata Landau, Ceulemans & Van Dingenen, 2018Alvania arubensis De Jong & Coomans, 1988Alvania aspera (Philippi, 1844)
 † Alvania asphaltodus Beets, 1942 
 † Alvania aturensis Lozouet, 1998Alvania auberiana (d'Orbigny, 1842)Alvania aupouria (Powell, 1937)Alvania aurantiaca (Watson, 1873)
 Alvania awa Chinzei, 1959
 † Alvania awamoaensis (Finlay, 1924)
 †Alvania babylonelliformis Gürs in Gürs & Spiegler, 1999
 Alvania baldoi Garilli & Parrinello, 2011Alvania balearica Oliver & Templado, 2009
 Alvania bartolinorum Amati & Smriglio, 2019
 † Alvania bartschi Olsson, 1942
 † Alvania basisulcata A. W. Janssen, 1972Alvania beanii (Hanley in Thorpe, 1844)
 † Alvania belgica Glibert, 1952
 † Alvania belli Harmer, 1920Alvania bermudensis Faber & Moolenbeek, 1987Alvania beyersi (Thiele, 1925)
 † Alvania beyrichii (Bosquet, 1859)
 † Alvania bicingulata (G. Seguenza, 1876)
 † Alvania bonneti Cossmann, 1921
 † Alvania boucheti Lozouet, 1998Alvania bounteyensis (Dell, 1950)
 Alvania bozcaadensis Tisselli & Giunchi, 2013
 Alvania brocchii Weinkauff, 1868
 † Alvania brusinai Schwartz von Mohrenstern in Brusina, 1877
 † Alvania burtoni Glibert, 1962
 †Alvania butonensis Beets, 1942 Alvania cabrensis Rolán & Hernández, 2007
 † Alvania calasi Van Dingenen, Ceulemans & Landau, 2016
 Alvania campanii Tisselli & Giunchi, 2013Alvania campta (Dall, 1927)Alvania canariensis (d'Orbigny, 1840)Alvania cancapae Bouchet & Warén, 1993Alvania cancellata (da Costa, 1778)Alvania canonica (Dall, 1927)
 † Alvania caporalii Chirli, 2006Alvania carinata (da Costa, 1778)
 † Alvania cathyae Landau, Marquet & Grigis, 2003
 † Alvania cerreti Gardella, Bertaccini, Bertamini, Bongiardino, Petracci & Tabanelli, 2021 
 † Alvania chilensis (Philippi, 1887)Alvania cimex (Linnaeus, 1758)Alvania cimicoides (Forbes, 1844)
 † Alvania cioppii Chirli, 2006Alvania clarae (Nofroni & Pizzini, 1991)Alvania clathrella (Seguenza L., 1903)Alvania claudioi Buzzurro & Landini, 2007Alvania colombiana Romer & Moore, 1988Alvania colossophilus Oberling, 1970Alvania compacta (Carpenter, 1864)Alvania concinna A. Adams, 1861
 † Alvania convexispira O. Boettger, 1906
 Alvania corayi Ladd, 1966Alvania corneti Hoenselaar & Goud, 1998Alvania corona Nordsieck, 1972Alvania coseli (Gofas, 1999)Alvania cosmia Bartsch, 1911
 † Alvania cossmanni Harmer, 1920
 † Alvania couffoni Landau, Ceulemans & Van Dingenen, 2018
 † Alvania craticula (Briart & Cornet, 1887)
 † Alvania critica Boettger, 1907Alvania cruzi (Castellanos & Fernández, 1974)Alvania crystallina (Garrett, 1873)Alvania curacaoensis De Jong & Coomans, 1988
 † Alvania curta (Dujardin, 1837)
 † Alvania daguini Peyrot, 1938Alvania dalmatica Buzzurro & Prkic, 2007Alvania datchaensis Amati & Oliverio, 1987
 † Alvania dautzenbergi Glibert, 1949Alvania debruynei Faber & Moolenbeek, 2004Alvania dejongi Faber & Moolenbeek, 2004Alvania deneti (Thiele, 1925)Alvania denhartogi Hoenselaar & Goud, 1998
 † Alvania densecostata Harmer, 1920
 Alvania desabatae Amati & Smriglio, 2016
 Alvania deweti (Thiele, 1925)
 † Alvania diadema De Stefani & Pantanelli in De Stefani, 1888Alvania dianiensis Oliverio, 1988Alvania dictyophora (Philippi, 1844)Alvania dijkstrai (Hoenselaar & Goud, 1998)
 † Alvania dimitrii Garilli & Parrinello, 2010
 † Alvania dingdensis (A. W. Janssen, 1967)Alvania dipacoi Giusti Fr. & Nofroni, 1989
 Alvania discazalorum Lozouet, 1998 †Alvania discors (Allan, 1818)Alvania disparilis Monterosato, 1890
 † Alvania dissensia Van Dingenen, Ceulemans & Landau, 2016
 Alvania distincta W. H. Turton, 1932
 † Alvania doliolum Lozouet, 2015
 †Alvania dollfusi (Cossmann & Pissarro, 1902)Alvania dorbignyi (Audouin, 1826)
 † Alvania dubiosa Harmer, 1920
 † Alvania dumasi (Cossmann, 1902)Alvania electa (Monterosato, 1874)Alvania elegantissima (Monterosato, 1875)Alvania elenae Gofas, 2007Alvania elisae Margelli, 2001
 † Alvania ellae (Boettger, 1901)Alvania emaciata (Mörch, 1876)
 † Alvania enysii (Bell, 1898)
 † Alvania erecta Harmer, 1920
 † Alvania erentoezae İslamoğlu, 2006Alvania euchila (Watson, 1886)
 Alvania eucraspeda (Hedley, 1911)
 † Alvania euphrosine De Stefani & Pantanelli in De Stefani, 1888
 Alvania excurvata Carpenter, 1857Alvania exserta (Suter, 1908)Alvania faberi De Jong & Coomans, 1988
 † Alvania falsimerelina Lozouet, 1998
 † Alvania falsivenus Lozouet, 2015
 † Alvania falunica Peyrot, 1938Alvania fasciata (Tenison Woods, 1876)Alvania fenestrata (Krauss, 1848)Alvania ferruginea A. Adams, 1861
 † Alvania fezata Landau, Ceulemans & Van Dingenen, 2018Alvania filocincta (Hedley & Petterd, 1906)Alvania fischeri (Jeffreys, 1884)Alvania flexilis Gofas, 1999
 † Alvania foraminata Lozouet, 1998Alvania formicarum Gofas, 1989Alvania fractospira (Oberling, 1970)
 † Alvania francescoi Garilli, 2008Alvania franseni Hoenselaar & Goud, 1998
 † Alvania frediani Della Bella & Scarponi, 2000Alvania freitasi Segers, Swinnen & De Prins, 2009
 Alvania fulgens W. H. Turton, 1932Alvania funiculata Gofas, 2007
 Alvania fusca Gould, 1861Alvania gallegosi Baker, Hanna & Strong, 1930Alvania gallinacea (Finlay, 1930)Alvania garrafensis Peñas & Rolán, 2008Alvania gascoignei Rolán, 2001Alvania gemina Rolán & Hernández, 2007Alvania geryonia (Nardo, 1847)
 † Alvania giselae (Boettger, 1901)
 † Alvania globosa Landau, Ceulemans & Van Dingenen, 2018Alvania gofasi (Rolán & Fernandes, 1990)
 † Alvania gontsharovae Iljina, 1993 †
 † Alvania gourbesvillensis Cossmann, 1921Alvania gradatoides (Finlay, 1930)Alvania grancanariensis Segers, 1999
 † Alvania granosa Tabanelli, Bongiardino & Perugia, 2011Alvania guancha Moolenbeek & Hoenselaar, 1989Alvania guesti Faber & Moolenbeek, 1987
 † Alvania gutta Tabanelli, Bongiardino & Perugia, 2011Alvania halia Bartsch, 1911Alvania hallgassi Amati & Oliverio, 1985Alvania harrietae Segers, Swinnen & De Prins, 2009
 †Alvania hauniensis Ravn, 1939Alvania hedleyi Thiele, 1930
 † Alvania helenae Boettger, 1901
 † Alvania heraelaciniae Ruggieri, 1950Alvania herwigia (Castellanos & Fernández, 1974)
 † Alvania hinschi Gürs & Weinbrecht, 2001Alvania hirta (Monterosato, 1884)Alvania hispidula (Monterosato, 1884)Alvania hoeksemai Hoenselaar & Goud, 1998
 †Alvania holsatica Anderson, 1960
 † Alvania holubicensis Friedberg, 1923
 † Alvania hortensis Lozouet, 1998
 Alvania hueti Bozzetti, 2017Alvania hyerensis Gofas, 2007Alvania ignota Cecalupo & Perugia, 2009Alvania ima Bartsch, 1911Alvania imperspicua (Pallary, 1920)Alvania incognita (Warén, 1996)
 Alvania inflata W. H. Turton, 1932
 † Alvania insulsa Landau, Ceulemans & Van Dingenen, 2018Alvania internodula (Hoenselaar & Goud, 1998)
 † Alvania interrupta (Finlay, 1924)Alvania isolata (Laseron, 1956)Alvania jacquesi Hoenselaar & Goud, 1998Alvania jeffreysi (Waller, 1864)Alvania johannae (Moolenbeek & Hoenselaar, 1998)
 Alvania joseae (Hoenselaar & Goud, 1998)Alvania josefoi Oliver & Templado, 2009
 † Alvania josephineae Landau, Ceulemans & Van Dingenen, 2018
 † Alvania kaawaensis (Laws, 1940)
 † Alvania kenneyi Ladd, 1966
 Alvania kermadecensis (Oliver, 1915)
 † Alvania kowalewskii Bałuk, 1975Alvania kowiensis Tomlin, 1931
 † Alvania lachesis (Basterot, 1825)
 † Alvania lachrimula Landau, Ceulemans & Van Dingenen, 2018
 † Alvania lactanea Glibert, 1949
 Alvania lactea (Michaud, 1832)
 †Alvania lagouardensis Lozouet & Maestrati, 1982Alvania lamellata Dautzenberg, 1889Alvania lampra (Dall, 1927)Alvania lanciae (Calcara, 1845)
 † Alvania laufensis Traub, 1981
 † Alvania laurae Brunetti & Vecchi, 2012Alvania lavaleyei Hoenselaar & Goud, 1998Alvania leacocki (Watson, 1873)
 †Alvania leopardiana Brunetti & Vecchi, 2012Alvania liesjeae Segers, Swinnen & De Prins, 2009
 † Alvania ligeriana Peyrot, 1938
 Alvania limensis (Ponder & Worsfold, 1994)Alvania lineata Risso, 1826Alvania litoralis (Nordsieck, 1972)
 Alvania littorinoides Cossmann, 1921 †Alvania lucinae Oberling, 1970Alvania macandrewi (Manzoni, 1868)Alvania macella Gofas, 2007Alvania maclurgi (Powell, 1933)Alvania mamillata Risso, 1826Alvania marchadi (Gofas, 1999)Alvania marioi Gofas, 1999Alvania marmarisensis Bitlis & Öztürk, 2017
 Alvania masirahensis Perugia, 2021
 Alvania maximilicutiani Scuderi, 2014Alvania mediolittoralis Gofas, 1989Alvania meridioamericana Weisbord, 1962
 † Alvania merlei Van Dingenen, Ceulemans & Landau, 2016Alvania microglypta Haas, 1943Alvania micropilosa Gofas, 2007Alvania microstriata (Hoenselaar & Goud, 1998)Alvania microtuberculata Gofas, 2007
 † Alvania milleti Landau, Ceulemans & Van Dingenen, 2018
 †Alvania milletispinosa Landau, Ceulemans & Van Dingenen, 2018
 Alvania minuscula (Verrill & Bush, 1900)
 † Alvania minuta (Finlay, 1924)
 † Alvania miocalasi Landau, Ceulemans & Van Dingenen, 2018
 † Alvania miolactea Landau, Ceulemans & Van Dingenen, 2018Alvania moerchi (Collin, 1886)Alvania moniziana (Watson, 1873)Alvania monserratensis (Baker, Hanna & Strong, 1930)Alvania moolenbeeki De Jong & Coomans, 1988Alvania multinodula Hoenselaar & Goud, 1998Alvania multiquadrata van der Linden & Wagner, 1989
 † Alvania multistriata (Bell, 1892)
 † Alvania napoleoni Landau, Ceulemans & Van Dingenen, 2018
 Alvania nemo Bartsch, 1911Alvania nestaresi Oliverio & Amati, 1990Alvania nicobarica (Thiele, 1925)Alvania nicolauensis Moolenbeek & Rolán, 1988
 Alvania nihonkaiensis Hasegawa, 2014Alvania nina Faber, 2010
 † Alvania nitida Brunetti & Vecchi, 2012
 Alvania nix Poppe, Tagaro & Goto, 2018Alvania nonsculpta (Hoenselaar & Goud, 1998)
 † Alvania obeliscus Harmer, 1920 †
 † Alvania obliquicostata H. Wang, 1981Alvania occidua (Cotton, 1944)
 † Alvania oceani (d'Orbigny, 1852)
 Alvania oetyliaca Amati & Chiarelli, 2017Alvania ogasawarana (Pilsbry, 1904)Alvania oldroydae Bartsch, 1911
 Alvania olivacea Frauenfeld, 1867Alvania oliverioi Buzzurro, 2003Alvania paatsi Hoenselaar & Goud, 1998Alvania pagodula (Bucquoy, Dautzenberg & Dollfus, 1884)
 †Alvania parasusieae Landau, Ceulemans & Van Dingenen, 2018
 † Alvania parazosta Lozouet, 1998
 †  Alvania pariana (Guppy in Guppy & Dall, 1896) 
 † Alvania partimcancellata Harmer, 1920
 † Alvania partschi (Hörnes, 1856)Alvania parvula (Jeffreys, 1884)Alvania peli Moolenbeek & Rolán, 1988
 Alvania peloritana (Aradas & Benoit, 1874)
 † Alvania perregularis Sacco, 1895
 † Alvania peyreirensis Cossmann & Peyrot, 1919Alvania piersmai Moolenbeek & Hoenselaar, 1989Alvania pinguis (Webster, 1906)Alvania pinguoides (Powell, 1940)
 Alvania pizzinii Amati, Smriglio & Oliverio, 2020Alvania pisinna Melvill & Standen, 1896Alvania planciusi Moolenbeek & Rolán, 1988Alvania platycephala Dautzenberg & Fischer H., 1896
 † Alvania playagrandensis Weisbord, 1962
 Alvania porcupinae Gofas & Warén, 1982Alvania portentosa Rolán & Hernández, 2007Alvania poucheti Dautzenberg, 1889
 † Alvania praeholsatica Gürs & Weinbrecht, 2001Alvania precipitata (Dall, 1889)
 † Alvania proavia (Pilsbry & C. W. Johnson, 1917)
 † Alvania productilis Boettger, 1906
 Alvania profundicola Bartsch, 1911
 Alvania prusi (P. Fischer, 1877)
 † Alvania pseudalvania (Andrusov, 1905)Alvania pseudoareolata Warén, 1974
 † Alvania pseudohispidula Brunetti & Vecchi, 2012Alvania pseudosyngenes Warén, 1973
 † Alvania pukeuriensis (Finlay, 1924)
 † Alvania pulcherrima Peyrot, 1938Alvania punctura (Montagu, 1803)Alvania purpurea Dall, 1871
 † Alvania putei Lozouet & Maestrati, 1982
 Alvania quadrata A. A. Gould, 1861
 † Alvania raulini Cossmann & Peyrot, 1919 †
 † Alvania redoniana Landau, Ceulemans & Van Dingenen, 2018Alvania regina Gofas, 1999
 † Alvania renauleauensis Landau, Ceulemans & Van Dingenen, 2018Alvania renei (Hoenselaar & Goud, 1998)
 † Alvania reticulatopunctata Seguenza, 1879Alvania richeri Gofas, 1999
 † Alvania riparia Lozouet, 1998
 † Alvania rischi Gürs & Weinbrecht, 2001
 † Alvania robusta Calas, 1949
 Alvania rominae Amati, Trono & Oliverio, 2020Alvania rosana Bartsch, 1911
 † Alvania rosariae Garilli, 2008
 † Alvania rotulata Pantanelli, 1888Alvania rudis (Philippi, 1844)
 † Alvania rupeliensis Tembrock, 1964Alvania rykeli Hoenselaar & Goud, 1998
 † Alvania sacyi Cossmann, 1921
 Alvania salebrosa Frauenfeld, 1867
 † Alvania sanctipaulensis Lozouet, 1998Alvania scabra (Philippi, 1844)Alvania schwartziana Brusina, 1866Alvania scrobiculata (Møller, 1842)
 Alvania scuderii Villari, 2017Alvania sculptilis (Monterosato, 1877)
 † Alvania seanlandaui Landau, Marquet & Grigis, 2003Alvania seinensis Gofas, 2007Alvania settepassii Amati & Nofroni, 1985
 † Alvania simonsi Marquet, 1997Alvania simulans Locard, 1886Alvania sleursi (Amati, 1987)Alvania slieringsi (Hoenselaar & Goud, 1998)Alvania solitaria (Dell, 1956)Alvania sombrerensis (Thiele, 1925)Alvania sororcula Granata-Grillo, 1877Alvania spinosa (Monterosato, 1890)
 † Alvania spirialis Glibert, 1949Alvania stenolopha Bouchet & Warén, 1993
 † Alvania stephanensis Lozouet, 1998Alvania stigmata Frauenfeld, 1867Alvania stocki Moolenbeek & Rolán, 1988Alvania strangei (Brazier, 1894)Alvania subareolata Monterosato, 1869Alvania subcalathus (Dautzenberg & Fischer H., 1906)
 † Alvania subclavata O. Boettger, 1906Alvania subcrenulata (Bucquoy, Dautzenberg & Dollfus, 1884)
 † Alvania subgaleodinopsis Lozouet, 2015
 † Alvania sublaevigata O. Boettger, 1906
 † Alvania sublagouardensis Lozouet, 1998Alvania subsoluta (Aradas, 1847)
 † Alvania subtiliangulosa Landau, Ceulemans & Van Dingenen, 2018
 Alvania subventricosa W. H. Turton, 1932Alvania suprasculpta (May, 1915)Alvania suroiti Gofas, 2007
 † Alvania susieae Landau, Ceulemans & Van Dingenen, 2018Alvania syngenes (A. E. Verrill, 1884)Alvania tarsodes (Watson, 1886)
 † Alvania tauropraecedens Sacco, 1895Alvania tenera (Philippi, 1844)Alvania tenhovei Hoenselaar & Goud, 1998
 † Alvania tenuicostata (G. Seguenza, 1876)
 † Alvania tenuisculpturata Landau, Ceulemans & Van Dingenen, 2018Alvania tessellata Weinkauff, 1868Alvania testae (Aradas & Maggiore, 1844)
 † Alvania textiliformis Harmer, 1920
 † Alvania thalia De Stefani & Pantanelli in De Stefani, 1888Alvania thouinensis (Thiele, 1925)Alvania tomentosa (Pallary, 1920)
 † Alvania tongrorum Glibert & de Heinzelin de Braucourt, 1954Alvania townsendi (Melvill, 1910)Alvania trachisma Bartsch, 1911
 † Alvania transiens Sacco, 1895Alvania tumida Carpenter, 1857Alvania turkensis Faber & Moolenbeek, 2004
 † Alvania turtaudierei Landau, Ceulemans & Van Dingenen, 2018
 Alvania unica Amati & Quaggiotto, 2019
 † Alvania urgonensis Cossmann, 1918Alvania valeriae Absalao, 1994Alvania vanegmondi Hoenselaar & Goud, 1998
 † Alvania varia Tabanelli, Bongiardino & Perugia, 2011
 † Alvania veliscensis Reuss, 1867
 †Alvania venus (d'Orbigny, 1852)Alvania venusta (Powell, 1926)Alvania verconiana (Hedley, 1911)Alvania vermaasi van Aartsen, 1975Alvania verrilli (Friele, 1886)Alvania versoverana (Melvill, 1910)Alvania villarii Micali, Tisselli & Giunchi, 2005
 †Alvania vinosula Anderson & Hanna, 1925
 † Alvania virodunensis Lozouet, 1998
 † Alvania waimamakuensis (Laws, 1948)
 † Alvania waisiuensis Beets, 1942Alvania wareni (Templado & Rolan, 1986)Alvania watsoni (Schwartz in Watson, 1873)Alvania weinkauffi Weinkauff, 1868
 Alvania whitechurchi W. H. Turton, 1932
 Alvania yamatoensis Hasegawa, 2014
 Alvania zaraensis Amati & Appolloni, 2019
 † Alvania zbyszewskii Van Dingenen, Ceulemans & Landau, 2016Alvania zetlandica (Montagu, 1815)
 † Alvania zibinica Pantanelli, 1888
 † Alvania ziliolii Brunetti & Vecchi, 2012
 † Alvania ziziphina Dollfus in Calas, 1949Alvania zoderi (Hoenselaar & Goud, 1998)Alvania zylensis Gofas & Warén, 1982Taxon inquirendum:
 Alvania montagui Iljina, 1993
 † Alvania sulzeriana Risso, 1826 
Species brought into synonymyAlvania albolirata (Carpenter, 1864): synonym of Lirobarleeia albolirata (Carpenter, 1864) (Does not belong to the genus Alvania) Alvania bartolomensis Bartsch, 1917: synonym of Lirobarleeia kelseyi (Dall & Bartsch, 1902)
 Alvania basteriae (Moolenbeek & Faber, 1986): synonym of Crisilla basteriae (Moolenbeek & Faber, 1986)Alvania carpenteri (Weinkauff, 1885): synonym of Onoba carpenteri (Weinkauff, 1885)
 Alvania chiriquiensis Olsson & McGinty, 1958: synonym of Lirobarleeia chiriquiensis (Olsson & McGinty, 1958)Alvania cingulata (Philippi, 1836): synonym of Alvania mamillata Risso, 1826Alvania clarionensis Bartsch, 1911: synonym of Lirobarleeia clarionensis (Bartsch, 1911) (original combination)Alvania consociella Monterosato, 1884: synonym of Alvania lanciae (Calcara, 1845)Alvania deliciosa (Jeffreys, 1884): synonym of Alvania electa (Monterosato, 1874)effreys J.G. 1884.Alvania firma (Laseron, 1956): synonym of Haurakia novarensis (Frauenfeld, 1867)Alvania formosita (Laseron, 1956): synonym of Haurakia novarensis (Frauenfeld, 1867)Alvania gagliniae Amati, 1985: synonym of Crisilla gagliniae (Amati, 1985)Alvania gradata (d'Orbigny, 1842): synonym of Lirobarleeia gradata (d'Orbigny, 1842)Alvania granti Strong, 1938: synonym of Lirobarleeia granti (Strong, 1938)Alvania herrerae Baker, Hanna & Strong, 1930: synonym of Lirobarleeia herrerae (Baker, Hanna & Strong, 1930)Alvania latior (Mighels & Adams, 1842): synonym of Setia latior (Mighels & C. B. Adams, 1842)Alvania lucasana Baker, Hanna & Strong, 1930: synonym of Lirobarleeia electrina (Carpenter, 1864)Alvania minuta (Golikov & Fedjakov in Scarlato, 1987): synonym of Punctulum minutum Golikov & Fedjakov, 1987Alvania novarensis Frauenfeld, 1867: synonym of Haurakia novarensis (Frauenfeld, 1867)Alvania obliqua Warén, 1974: synonym of Onoba obliqua (Warén, 1974)Alvania perlata Mörch, 1860: synonym of Lirobarleeia perlata (Mörch, 1860)Alvania porcupinae Gofas & Warén, 1982: synonym of Punctulum porcupinae (Gofas & Warén, 1982)Alvania supranitida S.V. Wood, 1842: synonym of Aclis minor (Brown, 1827)Alvania trajectus (Watson, 1886): synonym of Haurakia novarensis (Frauenfeld, 1867)Alvania wyvillethomsoni (Friele, 1877): synonym of Punctulum wyvillethomsoni (Friele, 1877)

References

 Monterosato T. A. (di) (1884). Nomenclatura generica e specifica di alcune conchiglie mediterranee. Palermo, Virzi, 152 pp.
 Crosse H. (1885). Nomenclatura generica e specifica di alcune conchiglie mediterranee, pel Marchese di Monterosato [book review]. Journal de Conchyliologie 33: 139-142 
 Ponder W. F. (1985). A review of the Genera of the Rissoidae (Mollusca: Mesogastropoda: Rissoacea). Records of the Australian Museum supplement 4: 1-221page(s): 36-46
 Vaught, K.C. (1989). A classification of the living Mollusca. American Malacologists: Melbourne, FL (USA). . XII, 195 pp.
 Gofas, S.; Le Renard, J.; Bouchet, P. (2001). Mollusca, in: Costello, M.J. et al. (Ed.) (2001). European register of marine species: a check-list of the marine species in Europe and a bibliography of guides to their identification''. Collection Patrimoines Naturels, 50: pp. 180–213
 Garilli V. 2008. On some Neogene to Recent species related to Galeodina Monterosato, 1884, Galeodinopsis Sacco, 1895, and Massotia Bucquoy, Dautzenberg, and Dollfus, 1884 (Caenogastropoda: Rissoidae) with the description of two new Alvania species from the Mediterranean Pleistocene. The Nautilus, 122(1): 19–51

External links

Gastropod genera
Rissoidae